Control of International Trade in Endangered Species also known as COTES is an organisation (1996) which complies with CITES.

COTES is used in the United Kingdom to convict wildlife crimes involving protected and endangered species.

References

Endangered species
Conservation in the United Kingdom